Cassida prasina is a greenish coloured beetle in the leaf beetle family.

Distribution
The species is found in the western Palearctic realm and from East to West China, including the provinces of Jilin and Xinjiang.

References

Cassidinae
Beetles described in 1798
Taxa named by Johann Karl Wilhelm Illiger
Beetles of Asia